"You Saw My Blinker" is the fourth and final single taken from DJ Jazzy Jeff & The Fresh Prince's fourth studio album, Homebase. The song marks one of only two times that Will Smith has cursed in the lyrics of a song, with the only other instance being "Tell Me Why", a song from Smith's fourth studio album, Lost and Found. The song tells the story of how The Fresh Prince (Smith) is driving down the highway with his girlfriend, preparing to take her to Palm Springs for weekend break. The story tells of an encounter with an older lady who begins to tailgate him, who Smith describes as "an old bat with glasses so thick she can't stay in her lane." Prince is then involved in an accident with the woman, with the two ending up in court. The woman pretends that she has serious injuries by wearing a neck brace. On the stand, the woman begins to cry, infuriating Prince. He is later restrained by security, who was seen "giving him the finger", is held in contempt of court. It is mentioned that Prince is driving a Mustang 5.0, and the older lady is driving a Pinto Coupe.

Track listing
 CD Single
 "You Saw My Blinker" (LP Version) - 4:11
 "You Saw My Blinker" (Lynn Tolliver's Radio Edit) - 3:55

 12" Vinyl
 "You Saw My Blinker" (LP Version) - 4:11
 "You Saw My Blinker" (Radio Remix) - 3:38
 "You Saw My Blinker" (Instrumental) - 3:45
 "Human Video Game" - 4:13

References
 

Songs about cars
1992 singles
DJ Jazzy Jeff & The Fresh Prince songs
Songs written by Will Smith
Songs written by DJ Jazzy Jeff
1991 songs
Jive Records singles